Senkevich is a Russian form of the Belarusian surname Siankievič. Polish equivalent: Sienkiewicz.

Alexander Senkevich (born 1941), Russian Indologist, philologist, translator from Hindi, writer, and poet.
Anton Senkevich (1970–2010), Russian footballer
Artyom Senkevich, Belarusian ice hockey player
Yuri Senkevich (1937–2003), Russian doctor, scientist, journalist and TV personality

See also
7980 Senkevich, an asteroid named after Yurij Aleksandrovich Senkevich

References

Russian-language surnames